The Equatorial Guinean Council of Ministers or Ministerial Council, consists of representatives from the Chamber of People's Representatives who are appointed by the president and confirmed by the members of the Chamber.

The Council of Ministers is chaired by the President and is tasked with managing government operations, drafting a budget and defining monetary policy.

Members of the Council of Ministers

Source

References

Politics of Equatorial Guinea
Equatorial Guinea